Tomasz Jędrzejak (14 July 1979 – 14 August 2018) was a Polish motorcycle speedway rider, who was a member of the Poland national speedway team. He became a Polish Individual Speedway Champion in 2012.

Speedway Grand Prix results

Career details

World Championships 
 Individual World Championship (Speedway Grand Prix)
 2007 – not classified – track reserve in Wrocław

European Championships 
 Individual European Championship
 2001 – 13th place (5 points)
 European Club Champions' Cup
 2007 – Silver medal (5 points)

Domestic competitions 
 Individual Polish Championship
 2003 – Bronze medal
 2009 – 12th place in Semi-Final 2
 2012 – Gold medal
 Polish Pairs Championship
 2000 – Bronze medal
 2001 – Bronze medal
 Polish Pairs U-21 Championship
 1999 – Polish Champion
 Team Polish Championship (League)
 2002 – Bronze medal
 Team U-21 Polish Championship
 2000 – Polish Champion

See also 
 Poland national speedway team

References

External links 
(pl) Official website

1979 births
2018 deaths
Polish speedway riders
Lakeside Hammers riders
People from Ostrów Wielkopolski
Sportspeople from Greater Poland Voivodeship
Suicides in Poland